Tanya or Tanja Chub  (born 16 May 1970, Kharkiv) is a Ukrainian-born Dutch draughts player. She won a silver medal for Draughts at the 1st World Mind Sports Games.

References 

1970 births
Living people
Dutch draughts players
Players of international draughts
Sportspeople from Kharkiv
Ukrainian draughts players
Ukrainian emigrants to the Netherlands